Giorgia Birkeland (born June 14, 2002) is an Italian-born American speed skater. She competed in the women's mass start event at the 2022 Winter Olympics.

Speed skating career
Birkeland started speed skating at the age of 8 in her hometown of White Bear Lake, Minnesota. In 2020, she made the national long-distance track team and competed at the World Junior Long Track Championships in Poland, finishing 11th place. Birkeland later participated at the AmCup, placing fourth in the mass start event and fourth in the 3000m event. She made the national team again for the 2021–22 season and placed seventh in the team pursuit event at the World Cup.

At the 2022 US trials, Birkeland won the final qualifying race and was given Team USA's discretionary spot for the Winter Olympics in Beijing. At the women's mass start event, she placed sixth in the second heat and advanced to the finals, where she finished in 12th place. It was her first mass start race at the senior international level.

At the Four Continents Championships in Calgary, Birkeland competed in four events, placing 10th in the 1000m, sixth in the 3000m event, fifth in the 1500m event, and winning the gold medal in the team pursuit event.

Personal life
Birkeland was born on June 14, 2002, in Scandiano, Italy. She grew up in White Bear Lake, Minnesota, and attended Mahtomedi High School. She later moved to Utah to train with the national team, where she attends Salt Lake Community College.

References

External links

2002 births
Living people
American female speed skaters
Speed skaters at the 2022 Winter Olympics
People from Scandiano
People from White Bear Lake, Minnesota
Salt Lake Community College alumni
Sportspeople from the Province of Reggio Emilia
Italian emigrants to the United States
World Single Distances Speed Skating Championships medalists